Mesías Antonio Guevara Amasifuén (born 13 June 1963) is a Peruvian politician and engineer, currently serving as the Governor of Cajamarca since 2019. A member of the Popular Action party, he currently serves as the party's president since 2014. He was previously a Congressman, representing Cajamarca between 2011 and 2016.

Early life and education
Guevara was born in the northern city of Chiclayo to a middle-class family on 13 June 1963. Upon completing his elementary education at an Adventist education in Jaén, Cajamarca, he was enrolled in the Elías Aguirre Military School of Chiclayo, from which he graduated in 1983 with a specialty in mechanics.

In 1987, he graduated as an electronic engineer from the Ricardo Palma University in Lima. In 2001, he completed a master's degree in administration at the Peruvian University of Applied Sciences. In addition, he holds a diploma in Advanced Studies from the University of Seville, from which he is currently a business administration doctoral candidate.

Academic and management career
Within his academic experience, Guevara served as Director of the Professional Academic School of Electronic Engineering of the Ricardo Palma University. In addition, he served as a lecturer at the graduate schools of the National University of San Marcos, Peruvian Union University, and the Federico Villarreal National University.

Guevara also managed companies such as Singular S.A, a Peruvian consulting company in Business Management and Telecommunications; ECI TELECOM IBERICA and AMPER PERU, Spanish telecommunications companies. He also served as general manager of the Lucent Technologies company (Peru chapter).

Political career

Early political career 
Guevara entered politics as he joined the Popular Action in 2004. At first, he was chosen to run for a seat in the Andean Parliament at the 2006 general election under the Center Front coalition, but he was not elected. The same year, he ran for the first time for Governor of Cajamarca, garnering 6% of the vote and was once again not elected. Four years later, he ran for a second time, with 5% of the vote and was once again not elected.

Congressman (2011–2016) 
As the Possible Peru Alliance was established for the 2011 general election, Guevara was selected to run for the Peruvian Congress, representing the Cajamarca region. Attaining 18,041 votes and as the coalition placed third in the region, he was elected as one of the five congressmen from the Popular Action party in Congress.

During his term, he remained an adamant voice against congressional reelection, for which he submitting a bill for amending the Constitution of Peru in order to rule-out immediate congressional reelection. His bill was ultimately rejected by the Constitution committee. For the next general election cycle, he declined to run for reelection, basing his decision in coherence to the motive of the bill. However, it was approved years later in a 2018 referendum.

Party politics 
At party leadership level, Guevara was elected President of Popular Action for the 2014-2019 term, defeating former Party President Víctor Andrés García Belaúnde and Elías Mendoza Habersperger. He currently still serves in the position although his term has expired, as the party is yet to convene a national convention to elect a new party leadership. He was previously, the General Secretary of the Popular Action from 2007 to 2009 and again from 2011 to 2013.

Presidential nomination run (2015) 
For the 2016 general election, Guevara announced his candidacy for President of Peru. At the primary election held on 20 December 2015, former Congressman Alfredo Barnechea won the presidential nomination with 52.1% of the vote, defeating Guevara who attained 41.5% of the vote.

Governor of Cajamarca (2019-2022) 
In the 2018 Peruvian regional and municipal elections, Guevara ran for the third time for Governor of Cajamarca. In the first round, he place second with 21.3% of the vote behind Walter Benavides Gavidia of the Alliance for Progress and ahead of incumbent Governor Walter Benavides Gavidia . In the run-off, he defeated Benavides Gavida with 61.4% of the vote.

At the start of his governorship in January 2019, he was elected President of the National Assembly of Regional Governments, with the support of President Martín Vizcarra and Prime Minister César Villanueva.

During Martín Vizcarra's administration, Guevara remained a strong supporter of the president at regional level. In the aftermath of Vizcarra's removal and the start of the protests in November 2020, he remained a strong critic of Manuel Merino's ascension to the presidency. As Popular Action leader, he disavowed Vizcarra's removal and Merino's role, siding with former Congressman Yonhy Lescano in not approving his party's congressional caucus' decision. He also called for Merino’s resignation as President alongside Lima Mayor Jorge Muñoz.

References

Living people
1963 births
Popular Action (Peru) politicians
Members of the Congress of the Republic of Peru
Peruvian engineers
People from Lambayeque Region